The 2023 Texas Tech Red Raiders baseball team represents Texas Tech University during the 2023 NCAA Division I baseball season. The Red Raiders  play their home games at Dan Law Field at Rip Griffin Park in Lubbock, Texas and compete as members of the Big 12 Conference. The are led by eleventh-year head coach Tim Tadlock.

Previous season
The 2022 team finished the regular season 36–18, 15–9 in Big 12 play, finishing fourth in the conference. The team went 1–2 in the Big 12 Tournament, defeating Kansas State in game 1, losing to Oklahoma in game 2 and were eliminated by Kansas State in game 3. The Red Raiders were invited to the Statesboro Regional, going 2–2. The team was defeated by Notre Dame in game 1, before defeating UNC Greensboro and host Georgia Southern in the next two games. The Red Raiders would be eliminated from the tournament in game 4, losing 1–2 against Notre Dame. The 2022 team finished the season with an overall record of 39–22.

Players drafted into the MLB

Preseason

Big 12 media poll
The Big 12's preseason poll was released on January 26.

Personnel

Coaching staff

Roster

Schedule

* indicates a non-conference game. All rankings from D1Baseball on the date of the contest. All times are in central time.

Rankings

References

External links
2023 Baseball schedule
2023 Baseball roster

Texas Tech Red Raiders
Texas Tech Red Raiders baseball seasons
Texas Tech Red Raiders baseball